Khattan is a Tehsil located in Kachhi District in the Balochistan province of Pakistan. Mostly the people are from the  Abro tribe who are living there.

Populated places in Kachhi District